was a Japanese painter and illustrator. His real name was Ishihara Tōru.

Biography
Ishihara was born in the city of Taisha, Shimane in 1923. He first encountered art through his frequent visits to a local theatre.  In 1941, at the age of 18, he moved to Manchukuo and then Mengjiang where he made a living painting advertisements for silent films. 

He was eventually drafted into the Imperial Japanese Army as part of its mobilization during the Second World War. While stationed in Mongolia, he was nearly killed in an incident of friendly fire, an experience that affected him greatly. Ishihara later attributed his disdain for authority of any kind to this event. After returning home to Japan, he attended lectures at Nihon University's art department where he was exposed to the artistic principles of Norman Rockwell.

He rapidly developed a reputation as an artistic genius, and so his contribution was in high demand and he began to work under an onerous schedule. At one point, he was obliged to draw 100 illustrations in 3 days. By the late 1950s and early 1960s, Ishihara was well known for his works' distinctive themes of eroticism and surreal horror. He also contributed to gay and BDSM magazines under the name .

One of his final works, a 1996 full-page cover illustration for the first issue of the magazine  featuring figurers such as Shoko Asahara and Ruth Norman, was published just prior to his death in 1998.

References 

1923 births
1998 deaths
People from Shimane Prefecture
Artists from Shimane Prefecture
Japanese military personnel of World War II
Japanese LGBT artists
Bisexual artists